DYTR (1116 AM) is a radio station owned and operated by Tagbilaran Broadcasting System. The station's studio is located at CAP Bldg., J. Borja St. cor. Carlos P. Garcia Ave., Tagbilaran, and its transmitter facilities are located at Brgy. Dao, Tagbilaran. DYTR is affiliated with Radio Mindanao Network since 2017.

References

News and talk radio stations in the Philippines
Radio stations established in 1980
Radio stations in Bohol